Crane is a surname. The name is a derivative of "Cron" in Old English or is the English translation of the German "Krahn" or "Kranich." According to The Oxford Dictionary of Family Names in Britain & Ireland, "Cron," "Krahn" and "Kranich" all mean "crown" in both Old English and German respectively. According to the same source, "Crone" is also compared with "Crane", "Crown", "Cron" and "Crowne". In some places in Britain, "Crane", when used as a name, can also be a reference to a tall, slender man, similar to the bird, "Crane" or to someone with long legs. Both the modern English version of "Crane" and modern German versions of "Krahn" or "Kranich" are more commonly associated with the tall bird than with a crown and the Old English and Old German translations have become less common.

Notable people with the surname include:

 Albert Victor Crane (1923–2003), Australian politician who was a member of the Legislative Assembly of Western Australia from 1974 to 1989, representing the seat of Moore
 Andy Crane (b. 1964), English radio and television presenter
 Arthur G. Crane (1877–1955), American teacher and politician
 Barry Crane (1927–1985), American television producer and director and bridge player
 Ben Crane (b. 1976), American professional golfer
 Bob Crane (1928–1978), American DJ and actor, played Hogan in the sitcom Hogan's Heroes
 Bob Crane (cricketer) (1942–2013), Australian cricketer
 Brian Crane, American cartoonist, creator of the Pickles comic strip
 Bruce Crane (1857–1937) American tonalist painter 
 Callum Crane, Scottish footballer
 Caprice Crane (b. 1974), American screenwriter, author, and producer
 Charles Crane, former mayor of Honolulu (1938–41)
 Charles Howard Crane (1885–1952), American architect
 Charles Richard Crane (1858–1939), American philanthropist
 Cheryl Crane (b. 1943), daughter of actress Lana Turner
 Dan Crane (1936-2020), American dentist and politician, former member of the US House of Representatives
 David Crane (disambiguation), several people
 Doris Crane (1911–1999), British artist
 Ed Crane (disambiguation), several people including the lead character of the 2001 film The Man Who Wasn't There
 Eva Crane, British researcher on bees and beekeeping 1912-2007
 Evan J. Crane, American chemist and editor of Chemical Abstracts 1915-1958
 Frederick E. Crane (1869–1947), Chief Judge of the NY Court of Appeals
 George W. Crane (1901–1995), psychologist, physician, and syndicated newspaper columnist
 Hart Crane (1899–1932), American poet
 Harry Crane (1914-1999), American comedy writer
 Hewitt Crane (1927–2008), pioneer computer scientist
 Horace Richard Crane (1907–2007), American physicist
 Israel Crane (1774–1858), American businessman
 James Crane (disambiguation), several people
 John Crane (disambiguation), several people
 Jordan Crane (comics) (b. 1973), American comics creator
 Jordan Crane (rugby union) (b. 1986), English rugby union player
 Joseph Halsey Crane (1782–1851), American soldier and attorney
 Laurence Crane (b. 1961), English composer
 Les Crane (1933–2008), American announcer and talk show host
 Louis Crane, quantum gravity theorist
 Lucy Crane (1842–1882), English writer, art critic and translator
 L. Stanley Crane (1915-2003), American railroad executive
 Mary Crane (disambiguation), Canadian politician
 Mason Crane (b. 1997), English cricketer
 Nicholas Crane (b. 1954), British cartographer, explorer and broadcaster
 Nicky Crane (1959–1993), British neo-Nazi activist
 Oliver Crane (1822-1896), American clergyman, scholar, writer
 Paul Crane (1944-2020), American football player
 Peter Crane (b. 1954), former Director of the Royal Botanic Gardens, Kew, London
 Phil Crane (1930-2014), American politician, long-serving Republican member of the US House of Representatives
 Richard T. Crane (1832–1912), Chicago industrialist
 Robert Crane (disambiguation), several people
 Ronald Crane (1886–1967), American literary critic and historian
 Roy Crane (1901–1977), American cartoonist
 Sarah Crane (b. 1972), Australian opera soprano
 Sibylla Bailey Crane (1851-1902), American educator, composer, author
 Simon Crane (b. 1960), British stuntman
 Stephen Crane (1871–1900), American author
 Stephen Crane (delegate) (1709–1780), American politician
 Susanne Crane (b. 1966), American artist
 Theodus Crane (b. 1979), American actor and martial artist
 Thomas Crane (1808-1859), English artist and portrait painter
 Thomas Frederick Crane (1844–1927), American folklorist, academic and lawyer
 Vincent Crane (1943–1989), founder of rock group Atomic Rooster
 Walter Crane (1845–1915), English artist, part of the Arts and Crafts movement
 Whitfield Crane (b. 1968), American musician
 William Crane (politician) (1785–1853), Canadian merchant and judge
 William M. Crane (1776–1846), US naval officer
 Winthrop M. Crane (1853–1920), governor of Massachusetts and US senator

Fictional characters
 Crane family from the TV soap opera Passions
 Alistair Crane
 Ethan Crane
 Fancy Crane
 Fox Crane
 Julian Crane
 Characters in the American sitcom Frasier
 Frasier Crane, also in Cheers
 Martin Crane, father of Frasier and Niles
 Niles Crane, younger brother of Frasier
 Denny Crane, a lawyer on the TV series Boston Legal
 Ichabod Crane, the main protagonist in the short story The Legend of Sleepy Hollow
 Jonathan Crane or Scarecrow, a comic book villain in the Batman series by DC Comics
 Kyle Crane, the player character in the video game Dying Light
 Lee Crane, Captain of the Seaview on the 60's TV series "Voyage to the Bottom of the Sea"
 Marion Crane, a character in the film Psycho and (called Mary Crane) in the novel on which the film was based
 Master Crane, a character from the animated movie Kung-Fu Panda
 Rebecca Crane, a fictional character in the Assassin's Creed franchise's modern storyline
 Seneca Crane, a character in the novel The Hunger Games

See also
 Crane (disambiguation)
 Krane (disambiguation)
 Castle Hill (Ipswich, Massachusetts), an estate owned by Richard Teller Crane Jr.

References

English-language surnames